(Iain) Colin Prentice  (born 25 June 1952) holds the AXA chair in biosphere and climate impacts at Imperial College London and an honorary chair in ecology and evolution at Macquarie University in Australia.

Education
Prentice was educated at the University of Cambridge where he studied the natural sciences tripos and was awarded a Bachelor of Arts degree in 1973 followed by a PhD in botany in 1977 for studies on pollen spectra.

Career and research
Prentice has held academic and research leadership appointments in several countries, including the chair of plant ecology at Lund University and a founding directorship of the Max Planck Institute for Biogeochemistry. He led the research programme quantifying and understanding the earth system for the Natural Environment Research Council (NERC). He developed the standard model for pollen source area, popularized now widely used techniques to analyse species composition along environmental gradients, and led the international development of successive generations of large-scale ecosystem models – from equilibrium biogeography (BIOME) to coupled biogeochemistry and vegetation dynamics (LPJ).  his research applies eco-evolutionary optimality concepts to develop and test new quantitative theory for plant and ecosystem function and land-atmosphere exchanges of energy, water and carbon dioxide, with the goal of more robust and reliable numerical modelling of land processes in the earth system science.

External links 
 Colin Prentice Leaf traits and environment: towards a comprehensive theory, in "New Phytologist Foundation"
 Colin Prentice State of ignorance - climate change and the biosphere, in "Imperial College London", AXA professorship inaugural presentation

References

1952 births
Living people
British ecologists
Fellows of the Royal Society